Instituto San Andrés is a high school in Rancagua, Cachapoal Province, Chile.

References 

Educational institutions with year of establishment missing
Secondary schools in Chile
Schools in Cachapoal Province